Damn Yankees is a 1955 musical comedy with a book by George Abbott and Douglass Wallop, music and lyrics by Richard Adler and Jerry Ross.  The story is a modern retelling of the Faust legend set during the 1950s in Washington, D.C., during a time when the New York Yankees dominated Major League Baseball. It is based on Wallop's 1954 novel The Year the Yankees Lost the Pennant.

The show ran for 1,019 performances in its original Broadway production. Adler and Ross's success with it and The Pajama Game seemed to point to a bright future for them, but Ross suddenly died of chronic bronchiectasis at age 29, several months after Damn Yankees opened.

Plot
NOTE: This is the plot of the 1994 Broadway revival of the show; there are differences from the original 1955 version. For the 1958 film version, see Damn Yankees (film).

Middle-aged real estate agent Joe Boyd is a long-suffering fan of the pathetic Washington Senators baseball team. His wife, Meg, laments this ("Six Months Out Of Every Year"). After she has gone to bed, he sits up late, grumbling that if the Senators just had a "long ball hitter" they could beat "those damn Yankees". Suddenly, the smooth-talking Mr. Applegate appears. He offers Joe the chance to become "Joe Hardy", the young slugger the Senators need. He accepts, even though he must leave Meg ("Goodbye Old Girl"). However, his business sense makes him insist on an escape clause. The Senators' last game is on September 25, and if he plays in it, he is to stay as Joe Hardy forever. If not, he has until 9:00 the night before to walk away from the deal and return to his normal life.

At the ballpark, the hapless Senators vow to play their best despite their failings ("Heart"). Then Joe Hardy is suddenly discovered and joins the team. Gloria Thorpe, a sports reporter, praises him ("Shoeless Joe from Hannibal, Mo"). His hitting prowess enables the team to move up in the standings.

Though Joe is increasingly successful, he truly misses Meg and moves into her house as a boarder in his persona as Joe Hardy. They begin to bond, especially over her "lost" husband ("A Man Doesn't Know"). Fearful of losing his deal, Applegate calls Lola, "the best homewrecker on [his] staff", to seduce Joe and ensure his loss of the bet. She promises to deliver ("A Little Brains, A Little Talent"), and Applegate introduces her as a sultry South American dancer named "Señorita Lolita Banana". She sings a seductive song ("Whatever Lola Wants"), but Joe's devotion to Meg proves too strong, even for her. Applegate punishes her by firing her, where she performs with other past workers for Applegate ("Who's Got the Pain").

Applegate decides to switch tactics to ensure Joe's failure. He releases false information about Joe's true identity being "Shifty McCoy", an escaped criminal and con artist. When Gloria discovers this information, she presses charges, and he is forced into court.
  
The Senators prepare for the final game against the Yankees for the pennant and worry about Joe, but they vow to think of nothing but winning ("The Game"). Meanwhile, angry fans are seeking him out, so he decides to leave home. As he does so, he tells Meg indirectly that he is her old husband ("Near to You"). Meanwhile, Applegate is exhausted by the work he has put into winning one bet and thinks about the "simpler" times in his long history ("Those Were the Good Old Days").

Joe's trial is held on September 24, the last day he can back out of his deal. As he technically does not exist, he cannot produce any kind of identification. The owner of the Senators, their coach, and even Lola (disguised as "Señora McCoy") testify, but their opinions carry no weight. Gloria suggests that Applegate take the stand, but he is unable to take the oath since it requires him to tell the truth. Joe realizes that Applegate is simply stalling to keep him from meeting his 9:00 deadline. Applegate claims that Joe "just needs time to think" and sends him to where Lola is, where history's most famous lovers wait. Lola meets him there and realizes that he truly loves Meg. She helps him by sending him into the final game and delays Applegate by coercing him into a duet ("Two Lost Souls").

When Applegate finally arrives at the game, it is 8:55, and Joe is at bat. As time runs out, Meg, her friends, and even Lola begin cheering for him. Applegate uses his powers to give Joe two strikes. The clock strikes nine, and Applegate claims victory, but at the last second, Joe cries, "Let me go!" The deal is broken, and he reverts to his old self but is still able to hit a home run, winning the pennant for the Senators.
  
Back at home, Joe rushes into Meg's arms. Applegate appears on the scene, claiming that Joe owes him his prize. He begs Meg to hold him and not let go, and she begins to sing ("Finale (A Man Doesn't Know)"). Applegate promises to make him young again and even ensure a World Series victory. But his powers are useless against their true love, which Lola points out. He shouts that such a thing cannot exist, but he is wrong. He and Lola vanish back to where they came from, defeated, with Joe and Meg united.

Productions

Original Broadway production 
The producers Frederick Brisson, Robert E. Griffith and Harold S. Prince had decided that the lead actress for the part of "Lola" had to be a dancer. They offered the role to both the movie actress Mitzi Gaynor and ballet dancer Zizi Jeanmaire, each of whom turned down the role. Although Gwen Verdon had sung just one song in her previous show (Can-Can), the producers were willing to take a chance on her. She initially refused, preferring to assist another choreographer, but finally agreed. Choreographer Bob Fosse insisted on meeting her before working with her, and after meeting and working for a brief time, they each agreed to the arrangement. This was the start of an artistic and personal partnership between Fosse and Verdon, who married in 1960.

The show opened on Broadway at the 46th Street Theatre on May 5, 1955, transferred to the Adelphi Theatre on May 17, 1957, and ran for a total of 1,019 performances. It was directed by George Abbott, with scenery and costumes by William and Jean Eckart, dances and musical numbers staged by Fosse, musical direction by Hal Hastings, orchestrations by Don Walker, and dance music arrangements by Roger Adams.

The show starred Ray Walston (Applegate), Verdon (Lola), Shannon Bolin (Meg), Robert Shafer (Joe Boyd), Elizabeth Howell (Doris), Stephen Douglass (Joe Hardy), Al Lanti (Henry), Eddie Phillips (Sohovik), Nathaniel Frey (Smokey), Albert Linville (Vernon, Postmaster), Russ Brown (Van Buren), Jimmy Komack (Rocky), Rae Allen (Gloria), Cherry Davis (Teenager), Del Horstmann (Lynch, Commissioner), Richard Bishop (Welch), Janie Janvier (Miss Weston),  and Jean Stapleton (Sister).

Original West End production 
A West End production played at the London Coliseum beginning on March 28, 1957, where it played for 258 performances. It starred Olympic skater Belita (aka Gladys Lyne Jepson-Turner) as Lola, but the Fosse choreography was alien to her style, and she was replaced by Elizabeth Seal. It also starred Bill Kerr as Applegate, and Ivor Emmanuel as Joe Hardy.

In the mid-1970s, Vincent Price starred as Applegate in summer stock productions of the show. In the late 1970s and early 1980s film actor Van Johnson did so in productions throughout the U.S.A. In July, 1981, a production was performed at the Jones Beach Marine Theater in Wantagh, New York. It was notable due to former New York Jets quarterback Joe Namath being cast in the role of Joe Boyd.

Broadway revival 
A Broadway revival opened at the Marquis Theatre on March 3, 1994 and ran for 519 performances and 33 previews. Featured were Jarrod Emick as Joe Hardy, winner of the 1994 Tony Award for Best Featured Actor in a Musical, Bebe Neuwirth as Lola and Victor Garber as Applegate. Garber was succeeded by Jerry Lewis, making his Broadway debut, on March 12, 1995, who then starred in a national tour and also played the role in a London production. Jack O'Brien directed, with choreography by Rob Marshall, assisted by his sister, Kathleen. O'Brien is also credited with revisions to the book.

West End revival 
The 1994 revival production opened in the West End at the Adelphi Theatre on June 4, 1997 (previews started May 29) and closed on August 9, 1997. Jerry Lewis reprised his role as Applegate and April Nixon played Lola.

North Shore Music Theatre 
In 2006, North Shore Music Theatre in Beverly, Massachusetts, presented a revised production with the Washington Senators replaced with the Yankees' traditional rivals, the Boston Red Sox. The revised book was written, with permission, by Joe DiPietro

Reprise! Broadway's Best 
In 2007, Reprise! Broadway's Best produced a revival. Jason Alexander directed, resetting the show to 1981 Los Angeles and making changes to accommodate a largely African-American and Hispanic cast. It opened November 7, 2007 and ran through November 25.

Encores! 
A revival was produced by the City Center Encores! Summer Stars series from July 5 to July 27, 2008. It starred Jane Krakowski as Lola, Sean Hayes as Applegate, Randy Graff as Meg, Megan Lawrence as Gloria Thorpe (replacing an injured Ana Gasteyer during rehearsal), PJ Benjamin as Joe Boyd, and Cheyenne Jackson as Joe Hardy. John Rando directed and the original Fosse choreography was reproduced by Mary MacLeod. Given the substantial changes in the 1994 revival, this is considered by some the first authentic revival of the original production.

Off-Broadway benefit performance 
A one-night-only off-Broadway benefit performance was staged by Roundabout Theatre Company. The benefit, which was directed by Kathleen Marshall, occurred on December 11, 2017. It starred Stephen Bogardus as Joe Boyd, Matthew Morrison as Joe Hardy, Victoria Clark as Meg, Maggie Gyllenhaal as Lola, Whoopi Goldberg as a gender-bent Applegate, Danny Burnstein as Van Buren, and Adrienne Warren as Gloria. It was produced by Scott Landis, Jerry Frankel, and Jay and Cindy Gutterman.

Musical numbers
Based on hand engraved materials originally available from Music Theatre International derived from the 1955 production

Act One
Overture — Orchestra
Curtain Act 1 — Orchestra
Six Months — Meg Boyd, Joe Boyd, Men, and Girls
Devil Music — Orchestra
Goodbye Old Girl — Joe Boyd and Joe Hardy
Heart — Van Buren, Smoky, Rocky, Vernon
Heart Encore — Van Buren, Smoky, Rocky, Vernon
Shoeless Joe from Hannibal, Mo. — Gloria Thorpe, Boys, Senators
Shoeless Joe Dance — Orchestra
A Man Doesn't Know — Joe Hardy
Lola — Orchestra
A Little Talent — Lola
Goodbye (Reprise) — Orchestra
A Man Doesn't Know (Reprise) — Joe Hardy, Meg
Whatever Lola Wants (with Dance Break) — Lola
Not Meg — Orchestra
Heart (Reprise) — Men
Chairs Fanfare — Orchestra
Who's Got The Pain? (with Double Dance Breaks) — Lola & Men (Street Band)
Act 1 Finale (New Shoeless Joe Finale) — Orchestra

Act Two
Entr'Acte — Orchestra
Opening Act 2 — Orchestra
The Game — Senators
Near to You — Joe Hardy and Meg Boyd
Good Old Days — Applegate
Days Encore — Applegate
Courtroom Blackout — Orchestra
Two Lost Souls (with Dance) — Lola and Joe Hardy
Devil Music — Orchestra
Shoeless Joe (Reprise) — Orchestra
Back Home — Orchestra
Finale (A Man Doesn't Know) — Meg and Joe Boyd
Bows (Heart) — Orchestra
Exit March — Orchestra

Based on 1994 revival

Act One
Overture
Six Months Out Of Every Year — Meg Boyd, Joe Boyd, Sister, Gloria Thorpe, Husbands, and Wives
Goodbye Old Girl — Joe Boyd and Joe Hardy
Blooper Ballet — The Senators
Heart — Van Buren, Smokey, Rocky, Linville
Shoeless Joe from Hannibal, Mo. — Gloria Thorpe, Senators
Shoeless Joe (Reprise) — Gloria Thorpe, Joe Hardy, and Ensemble (1994 revival only, used elements of the song in the style of retro-1950s commercials)
A Little Brains, a Little Talent — Lola
A Man Doesn't Know — Joe Hardy and Meg Boyd
Whatever Lola Wants — Lola

Act Two
Who's Got the Pain? — Lola and Senators (Originally, this came at the end of Act One, as "The Game" started Act Two)
The Game — Rocky, Smokey, and Senators
Near to You — Joe Hardy and Meg Boyd (1994 IBDB shows the addition of Joe Boyd)
Those Were the Good Old Days — Applegate
Two Lost Souls — Lola and Applegate (1994 IBDB shows Applegate, 1955 IBDB shows Hardy)
A Man Doesn't Know (Reprise) — Meg and Joe Boyd

Notable casts and characters

Original Broadway replacements 
Source 

 Meg Boyd: Charlotte Fairchild
 Lola: Sheila Bond, Gretchen Wyler, Devra Korwin
 Applegate: Howard Caine
 Gloria: Sally Brown

Original West End replacements 

 Applegate: Vincent Price, Van Johnson

Broadway Revival replacements 

 Joe Hardy: Eric Kunze, Jason Workman
 Lola: Charlotte d'Amboise
 Applegate: Jerry Lewis
 Gloria: Liz Larsen

Characters
Joe Boyd — A middle-aged, overweight married man who is in love with baseball, especially the Senators [the "older" Joe Hardy]
Joe Hardy — The 22-year-old, home-run-hitting transformation of Joe Boyd
Meg Boyd — Joe's loyal, traditional wife
Lola — The Devil's seductress assistant
Mr. Applegate — The Devil in disguise as a slick salesman
Van Buren — The hard working manager of the Senators with great heart but no luck
Gloria Thorpe — A probing reporter
Rocky — A baseball player for the Senators
Smokey — A "dim bulb" catcher for the Senators
Cherry — A friend of Meg
Doris — A friend of Meg
Sister — A friend of Meg
Mr. Welch — The owner of the Senators
Others: Bouley (also called Ibsen in some productions), Vernon, Henry, Linville, Sohovik, Lowe, Mickey, Del, Miss Weston, Postmaster and The Commissioner
Baseball players and batboys; Baseball fans' wives
(The original Broadway version also had a children's chorus who sang the reprise of "Heart")

Recordings, film, and television

The 1955 Original Broadway Cast recording is on RCA Victor, recorded May 8, 1955. The LP was originally issued in mono but in 1965 RCA Victor offered an electronic stereo version. The current CD edition was released in 1988.  RCA Victor also released the film soundtrack in 1958. Although recorded in stereo, only the mono version was released. The 1989 CD edition marked the first release of the recording in stereo. The 1994 Broadway revival cast recording  made by Mercury (and now on the Decca Broadway label) was released on May 17, 1994.

A film version, directed by George Abbott and Stanley Donen, was released in 1958. With the exception of Tab Hunter in the role of Joe Hardy (replacing Stephen Douglass), the Broadway principals reprised their stage roles.

A made-for-TV movie version was broadcast on April 8, 1967, on NBC. Phil Silvers played Applegate. Also starring were Lee Remick as Lola and Ray Middleton as Joe Boyd.

In 1983,  Ray Walston expressed interest in recreating Applegate in Raisin' Cane, a new musical in which the devil returns to ruin Broadway. In a spin on Damn Yankees, this time Applegate takes a young girl and grows her up and gets her the lead in a Broadway show, planning to change her back, bankrupting all the investors. Book, music and lyrics are by San Francisco Bay Area writer/lyricist/composer Ted Kopulos.

In 2009, it was announced that a new contemporary film adaptation of the musical will star Jim Carrey as Applegate and Jake Gyllenhaal as Joe Hardy. No further announcements about this adaptation have been made since (as of December 2020).

Awards and nominations

Original Broadway production

1994 Broadway revival

1997 London revival

Notes

References

External links

 (1958 film)
 Damn Yankees at the Music Theatre International website

Henry, William A. III (March 14, 1994). "Damn Yankees Is Back At Bat". Time. Review of the revival
Profile at Broadwaymusicalhome.com
Profile at Stageagent.com
Damn Yankees lyrics
Information and links about the musical from Theatrehistory.com
Information from Thebroadwaymusicals.com website 

1950s fantasy films
1955 musicals
1960s American television specials
1967 in American television
1967 television films
1967 films
American television films
Broadway musicals
Music based on the Faust legend
Musical television films
Musical television specials
Musicals based on novels
Musicals by George Abbott
Musicals by Douglass Wallop
Musicals by Richard Adler
Musicals by Jerry Ross
Musicals choreographed by Bob Fosse
Works about the New York Yankees
Rapid human age change in fiction
Fiction about the Devil
Tony Award for Best Musical
Washington Senators (1901–1960)
Musical comedy television shows
Tony Award-winning musicals
Films about Major League Baseball